Ventaquemada is a town and municipality in the Central Boyacá Province, part of the Colombian department of Boyacá. Ventaquemada borders Tunja and Samacá in the north, Boyacá, Boyacá, Jenesano and Nuevo Colón in the east, Turmequé and Villapinzón in the south and Guachetá, Lenguazaque and Villapinzón in the west.

Etymology 
Former names of Ventaquemada are Padua and La Venta, indicating the commercial centre at a strategical location along the road between Bogotá and Tunja, historically the most important cities of the Altiplano. After the burning of the properties of Albarracín, the name Ventaquemada ("burnt sale") was given to the town.

History 
The area of Ventaquemada before the Spanish conquest was populated by the Muisca, who were organised in their loose Muisca Confederation. Ventaquemada was part of the rule of the zaque of Hunza.

Modern Ventaquemada was founded on December 17, 1777, by viceroy Manuel Antonio Flórez.

Ventaquemada is close to the Puente de Boyacá, the bridge where the decisive Battle of Boyacá in the struggle for independence of Colombia was fought. Ventaquemada has a classical colonial house and a statue honouring independence hero Simón Bolívar. The train station of Ventaquemada has long been abandoned.

Economy 
Main economical activity of Ventaquemada is agriculture; potatoes and maize are the major products cultivated.

Born in Ventaquemada 
 Héctor Moreno, former Colombian racewalker

Gallery

References 

Municipalities of Boyacá Department
Populated places established in 1777
1777 establishments in the Spanish Empire
Muisca Confederation